HMS Onslaught was a  which served with the Royal Navy during the First World War. The M class were an improvement on the previous , capable of higher speed. The vessel, launched in 1915, joined the Twelfth Destroyer Flotilla under the flotilla leader . The ship saw action during the Battle of Jutland in May 1916, jointly sinking the German torpedo boat  and launching the torpedo that sank the pre-dreadnought battleship , the only German battleship to be lost in the battle. Subsequently, the destroyer acted as an escort to other naval ships during the Action of 19 August 1916 and took part in anti-submarine operations. At the end of the war, Onslaught was withdrawn from service and, in 1921, sold to be broken up.

Design and development
Onslaught was one of twenty-two  destroyers ordered by the British Admiralty in November 1914 as part of the Third War Construction Programme. The M-class was an improved version of the earlier  destroyers, required to reach a higher speed in order to counter rumoured German fast destroyers. It transpired that the German ships did not exist.

Armament consisted of three single QF  Mk IV  guns on the ship's centreline, with one on the forecastle, one aft on a raised platform and one between the middle and aft funnels. A single 2-pounder (40 mm) Mk II pom-pom anti-aircraft gun was carried, while torpedo armament consisted of two twin mounts for  torpedoes. The ship had a complement of 76 officers and ratings.

Construction and career
Onslaught was launched by Fairfield Shipbuilding and Engineering Company at their shipyard in Govan on the River Clyde on 4 December 1915 and completed on 3 March the following year. This was the first time the name had been used in the Royal Navy. The vessel was deployed as part of the Grand Fleet, joining the Twelfth Destroyer Flotilla under the flotilla leader . On 22 April, the destroyer operated with the light cruisers of the Grand Fleet off the Skegerrak.

On 30 May 1916, the destroyer sailed with the Grand Fleet to confront the German High Seas Fleet in what would be the Battle of Jutland. The destroyer was deployed in action against the German light cruisers. Shortly afterwards, the division saw the approaching line of the German Third Torpedo Boat Flotilla and attacked. The destroyer, along with the rest of the flotilla, sank the torpedo boat , previously disabled by the destroyer . As the battle closed, the flotilla spotted the retreating German line. The First Division was ordered to attack and use their superior speed to speed ahead of the German ships. The destroyer attacked the German fleet, unleashing four torpedoes, at least one of which struck the pre-dreadnought battleship . The torpedoes caused the  magazines to detonate, sinking the ship with all hands. This was the only battleship sunk during the battle. During the attack, a German shell had struck the destroyer's bridge, killing five crew.

The destroyer subsequently participated in the Action of 19 August 1916 as an escort for the light cruiser . While escorting the cruiser to rendezvous with a major part of the Grand Fleet, the vessel was attacked by the German submarine , but the torpedo missed. Onslaught subsequently also escorted the dreadnought battleship . In 1917, the Twelfth Destroyer Flotilla was involved in anti-submarine operations, and for nine days from 15 June the destroyer was stationed off the north of Scotland. The operation did not lead to the destruction of any submarines and the Admiralty increasingly redeployed the destroyers of the Grand Fleet to escorting convoys. During 1918, Onslaught was transferred to the Third Destroyer Flotilla.

After the Armistice, the Royal Navy returned to a peacetime level of strength and both the number of ships and the amount of staff needed to be reduced to save money. Onslaught was reduced to reserve on 17 October 1919. However, the harsh conditions of wartime service, exacerbated by the fact that the hull was not galvanised and operations often required high speed in high seas, meant that the destroyer was worn out and ready for retirement. On 30 October 1921, the vessel was sold to W. & A.T. Burden and broken up.

Pennant numbers

References

Citations

Bibliography
 
  
 
 
 
 
 
 
 
 
 
 
 
 
 
 
 
 

1915 ships
Admiralty M-class destroyers
Ships built on the River Clyde
World War I destroyers of the United Kingdom